Mohammad Sadeghi (born March 16, 1952) is a retired Iranian football player.

Club career
He played for Gomrok Ahvaz F.C., Pas F.C., Persepolis F.C. and Shahin F.C. He was one of the key players of Pas winning the Iranian Takht Jamshid in 1977 and 1978, of Persepolis F.C. winning the Iranian nationwide tournament Espandi Cup and the Tehran Hazfi Cup in 1979 as well as of Shahin winning the Tehran Cup in 1981.

International career
Sadeghi  made 38 appearances for the Iran national football team and played at the 1972 Olympics and 1978 FIFA World Cup. He was also a member of the Iranian teams that won the football tournament at the 1974 Asian Games and the 1976 Asian Cup.

References

External links

Iranian footballers
Iran international footballers
Association football midfielders
Pas players
1976 AFC Asian Cup players
1978 FIFA World Cup players
AFC Asian Cup-winning players
People from Ahvaz
1952 births
Living people
Shahin FC players
Persepolis F.C. players
Olympic footballers of Iran
Footballers at the 1972 Summer Olympics
Asian Games gold medalists for Iran
Asian Games medalists in football
Medalists at the 1974 Asian Games
Footballers at the 1974 Asian Games
Sportspeople from Khuzestan province
20th-century Iranian people